Arsinic acids are organoarsenic compounds with the formula R2AsO2H.  They are formally, but not actually, related to arsinic acid, a hypothetical compound of the formula H2AsO2H.  Arsinic acids are monoprotic, weak acids.  They react with sodium sulfide to give the dithioarinates R2AsS2Na.
  Arsinic acids are related to phosphinic acids (R2PO2H.).

Well known arsinic acids include diphenylarsinic acid and cacodylic acid, R2AsO2H (R = Ph, Me, respectively).

References

Organoarsenic compounds